SS Amerika may refer to the following ships:
 , launched in 1905 as SS Amerika by Harland & Wolff in Belfast for the Hamburg America Line of Germany as a passenger ocean liner, before becoming USS America in 1917
 , an ocean liner renamed in 1893 as SS Amerika by Thingvalla Line of Copenhagen

See also
 Amerika (disambiguation)
 

Ship names